Aunjanue L. Ellis ( born February 21, 1969) is an American actress. She had roles in the films Men of Honor (2000), The Caveman's Valentine (2001), Undercover Brother (2002), Ray (2004), Freedomland (2006), The Express: The Ernie Davis Story (2008), The Taking of Pelham 123 (2009) and The Help (2011). In 2021, Ellis starred in the critically acclaimed film King Richard, which earned her nominations for the Academy Award, Golden Globe Award, British Academy Film Award, and Critics' Choice Movie Award for Best Supporting Actress.

On television, Ellis had recurring roles in the ABC police drama series High Incident (1996–1997), The Practice (1999), True Blood (2008), and The Mentalist (2010–2013), and played roles in a number of television films, such as Gifted Hands: The Ben Carson Story (2009), Abducted: The Carlina White Story (2013), and The Clark Sisters: First Ladies of Gospel (2020). In 2015, Ellis played the leading role in the miniseries The Book of Negroes, based on a bestselling novel by Lawrence Hill. She received critical acclaim and a Critic's Choice Television Award nomination for Best Actress in a Movie/Miniseries.

From 2015 to 2017, she starred as Miranda Shaw in the ABC thriller series Quantico, and in 2016, Ellis played Nancy Turner, Nat Turner's mother, in the period drama film The Birth of a Nation. In 2019, she received a nomination for the Primetime Emmy Award for Outstanding Lead Actress in a Limited Series or Movie for her performance in the Netflix miniseries When They See Us. Ellis later starred in the HBO drama series Lovecraft Country (2020), for which she was nominated for a Primetime Emmy Award and a Screen Actors Guild Award.

Early life
Ellis was born in San Francisco, California, and raised on her grandmother's farm in Magnolia, Mississippi. She attended Tougaloo College before transferring to Brown University, where she completed her Bachelor of Arts in African-American studies. She also studied acting with Jim Barnhill and John Emigh. During her years at Brown University, Ellis made her debut in a student play. She went on to study acting in the Graduate Acting Program at New York University's Tisch School of the Arts. She is a member of Delta Sigma Theta sorority.

Career

1990s
In 1995, Ellis made her professional acting debut appearing as Ariel opposite Patrick Stewart's Prospero in a Broadway revival of William Shakespeare's The Tempest. She later made her screen debut in the episode of Fox police drama series New York Undercover. In 1996, she had the co-leading role in the independent film Girls Town alongside Lili Taylor. During the late 1990s, Ellis also had supporting roles in films such as Ed's Next Move, Desert Blue, In Too Deep, and A Map of the World. From 1996 to 1997, Ellis starred as Officer Leslie Joyner in the ABC police drama series High Incident, created by Steven Spielberg. The series was canceled after two seasons. In 1999, she had the recurring role of Sharon Young on the ABC legal drama, The Practice.

2000s
In 2000, Ellis starred opposite Cuba Gooding Jr. in George Tillman, Jr.'s drama film Men of Honor. The following year, she played daughter of Samuel L. Jackson's character in the mystery-drama film The Caveman's Valentine, directed by Kasi Lemmons and based on George Dawes Green's 1994 novel of the same name. Also in 2001, Ellis had a supporting part in the critically acclaimed comedy-drama film Lovely & Amazing.

In 2002, she had main role alongside Eddie Griffin in the action comedy film Undercover Brother. In 2004, she played Mary Ann Fisher in the Academy Award-nominated biographical film about musician Ray Charles, Ray. In 2007, Ellis played the leading role in the thriller Cover, which received negative reviews. During this time, she also appeared in films such as Freedomland (2006), The Express (2008) and Notorious (2009). She played Denzel Washington's wife in the 2009 film The Taking of Pelham 123, directed by Tony Scott.

On television, in 2002 Ellis had a regular role on the short-lived ABC medical drama MDs. From 2005 to 2006, she co-starred alongside Benjamin Bratt in another short-lived drama E-Ring on NBC. She also had recurring roles on Third Watch, 100 Centre Street, Jonny Zero, Justice and True Blood. In 2009, she co-starred alongside Cuba Gooding Jr. and Kimberly Elise in the made-for-television film, Gifted Hands: The Ben Carson Story.

Ellis has also appeared in a number of Broadway and Off-Broadway theatre productions. In January 2004, she performed in Regina Taylor's play Drowning Crow, at the Manhattan Theatre Club. In the Spring, 2012 Hampton University semester, she taught entertainment industry courses. She was also featured in a Hampton Players and Company production, "Through the Crack."

2010s
In 2010, Ellis co-starred opposite Wesley Snipes in the action film Game of Death. She also played the leading role in the independent film The Tested based on the award-winning 2005 short film of the same name. In 2011, she appeared in the critically acclaimed period drama The Help, directed by Tate Taylor, as Eula Mae Davis, one of the maids, for which she received awards as a part of the ensemble cast. In 2014, she played Vicki Anderson in the biographical drama film Get on Up about the life of singer James Brown, which was also directed by Tate Taylor. As lead actress, Ellis starred in the independent films Money Matters (2011), The Volunteer (2013), Romeo and Juliet in Harlem (2014), and Una Vida: A Fable of Music and the Mind (2014). She also played the leading role in the 2012 television film Abducted: The Carlina White Story.

From 2010 to 2013, Ellis had a recurring role in the CBS series The Mentalist, as Madeleine Hightower. She also played Ashley Judd's best friend in the 2012 ABC miniseries Missing, and had another role on the CBS procedural, NCIS: Los Angeles. Ellis also starred as one of the lead characters in the 2013 AMC pilot The Divide. When WE tv picked up the show, Ellis left and was recast with Nia Long.

In 2014, Ellis was cast as the lead in the international co-production epic miniseries The Book of Negroes, based on Lawrence Hill’s bestselling 2007 novel. The Book of Negroes premiered in 2015, and Ellis received critical acclaim for her performance. The Hollywood Reporter critic Whitney Matheson praised her performance. "Except for the first installment that focuses on Aminata’s girlhood, Ellis is present in nearly every scene, aging decades and displaying a stunning range of emotion." Ellis received a Critics' Choice Television Award for Best Actress in a Movie or Miniseries nomination for her performance. 

On February 25, 2015, it was announced that Ellis was cast in the ABC thriller series Quantico. She left the series after two seasons in 2017. In 2016, Ellis co-starred in the historical drama film The Birth of a Nation, based on the story of the 1831 slave rebellion led by Nat Turner. The film also stars Nate Parker, Aja Naomi King, Armie Hammer and Gabrielle Union. Ellis plays the role of Nancy Turner, Nat's mother, in the film. Also in 2016, she was cast opposite Keke Palmer in the drama film Pimp about life for women on the streets of New York and work in the illegal sex trade. In 2018, she appeared in If Beale Street Could Talk, a drama film written and directed by Barry Jenkins.

In February 2018, Ellis was cast in a leading role on the CBS drama pilot Chiefs, which was not picked up to series. Later, she was cast in the independent drama film Miss Virginia opposite Uzo Aduba and Vanessa Williams. In 2019, she starred in the Ava DuVernay-directed miniseries When They See Us for Netflix. She received a Primetime Emmy Award for Outstanding Lead Actress in a Limited Series or Movie nomination for her performance.

2020s
In 2020, Ellis portrayed Mattie Moss Clark, the mother of The Clark Sisters, in the Lifetime television film The Clark Sisters: First Ladies of Gospel. The film premiered on April 11, 2020, with positive reviews from critics and was the highest-rated original movie for Lifetime since 2016. Ellis was specifically praised by critics, fans, and the Clark Sisters for her performance. She received NAACP Image Award for Outstanding Actress in a Television Movie, Mini-Series or Dramatic Special nomination for her performance.

Ellis co-starred in the 2020 HBO drama series Lovecraft Country based on the novel of the same name by Matt Ruff. For her performance, she received Primetime Emmy Awards nomination for Outstanding Supporting Actress in a Drama Series.

In 2021, Ellis starred as Oracene Price opposite Will Smith in King Richard, a biopic about Richard Williams. Her performance in the film received critical acclaim, earning the actress her first Academy Award for Best Supporting Actress and Golden Globe Award for Best Supporting Actress – Motion Picture nominations. Ellis also received nominations at the Critics' Choice Movie Awards, Satellite Awards and Black Reel Awards, winning the National Board of Review Award for Best Supporting Actress.

In January 2022, Ellis was cast alongside Andra Day, Glenn Close and Mo'Nique in Netflix's exorcism thriller film The Deliverance, directed by Lee Daniels. Ellis starred opposite Courtney B. Vance in the AMC courtroom limited drama series, 61st Street. Later, she joined the cast of 2023's The Color Purple. Her casting for Justified: City Primeval, the limited series inspired by Elmore Leonard’s City Primeval: High Noon in Detroit, was announced in May. In July, she was cast alongside Uzo Aduba and Sanaa Lathan in the adaptation of Tina Mabry’s The Supremes At Earl's All-You-Can-Eat for Searchlight Pictures. She was cast in the film adaptation of The Nickel Boys, also featuring Hamish Linklater and Fred Hechinger, in October 2022. In January 2023, she was cast in a leading role in the Ava DuVernay film Caste, adaptation of Isabel Wilkerson’s Caste: The Origins of Our Discontents.

Personal life
In her 2022 interview with Variety magazine, Ellis came out as bisexual.

Filmography

Film

Television

Awards and nominations

References

Further reading
 Brenna, Susan. “Up and Coming; Aunjanue Ellis and Carrie Preston; Two Young Performers Ride the Tempest.” The New York Times, December 17, 1995, p. 2002006, www.nytimes.com/1995/12/17/theater/up-coming-aunjanue-ellis-carrie-preston-two-young-performers-ride-tempest.html.
 Current Biography. Bronx, N.Y: H.W. Wilson Co, 1940. Print.

External links

 
 

1969 births
20th-century American actresses
21st-century American actresses
Actresses from Mississippi
African-American actresses
American film actresses
American stage actresses
American television actresses
Brown University alumni
Living people
Tisch School of the Arts alumni
Actresses from San Francisco
Delta Sigma Theta members
Bisexual actresses
Bisexual women
LGBT African Americans
LGBT people from California